The 2017 Waco Showdown was a professional tennis tournament played on outdoor hard courts. It was the third edition of the tournament and was part of the 2017 ITF Women's Circuit. It took place in Waco, United States, on 6–12 November 2017.

Singles main draw entrants

Seeds 

 1 Rankings as of 30 October 2017.

Other entrants 
The following players received a wildcard into the singles main draw:
  Sanaz Marand
  Maria Mateas
  Maria Sanchez
  Theresa van Zyl

The following player received entry using a protected ranking:
  Jessica Pegula

The following players received entry from the qualifying draw:
  Victoria Duval
  Ulrikke Eikeri
  An-Sophie Mestach
  Katerina Stewart

Champions

Singles

 Taylor Townsend def.  Ajla Tomljanović, 6–3, 2–6, 6–2

Doubles
 
 Sofia Kenin /  Anastasiya Komardina def.  Jessica Pegula /  Taylor Townsend, 7–5, 5–7, [11–9]

External links 
 2017 Waco Showdown at ITFtennis.com
 Official website

2017 ITF Women's Circuit
2017 in American tennis
Tennis tournaments in the United States